5705 may refer to;

 The year 5705 in the 6th millennium
 The Hebrew year 5705
 5705 Ericsterken, a Main Belt asteroid discovered in 1965
 NGC 5705, a spiral galaxy in the constellation Virgo
 "5.7.0.5.", a 1978 song by the British rock group City Boy